Gad is an unincorporated community located in Marathon and Taylor Counties, Wisconsin, United States. The Marathon County portion of Gad is in the town of Bern, while the Taylor County portion is in the town of Browning. The community once had a school called the Gad School; it is now part of the Medford Area School District.

References

Unincorporated communities in Marathon County, Wisconsin
Unincorporated communities in Taylor County, Wisconsin
Unincorporated communities in Wisconsin